Elevator to the Gallows, also known as Frantic in the U.S. and Lift to the Scaffold in the U.K., is a 1958 French crime thriller film directed by Louis Malle, starring Jeanne Moreau and Maurice Ronet as illicit lovers whose murder plot starts to unravel after one of them becomes trapped in an elevator. The scenario was adapted from the 1956 novel of the same name by Noël Calef.

Associated by some critics with film noir, and introducing new narrative, cinematographic, and editing techniques, the film is considered an important work in establishing the French New Wave and the New Modern Cinema. The improvised soundtrack by Miles Davis and the relationship the film establishes among music, image, and emotion were considered ground-breaking.

Plot
Lovers Florence Carala and Julien Tavernier make a plan to kill Florence's husband Simon, a wealthy French industrialist who is also Julien's boss. Staying late at the office one Saturday, Julien, an ex-Foreign Legion parachutist and veteran of the Indochinese and Algerian wars, uses a rope to climb up the outside of the building to Simon's office and shoots Simon with Simon's own gun, afterward arranging the room to make it look like a suicide. He then makes his way back to his office and leaves the building with a secretary and security guard, who are to be his alibis. When he gets into his convertible, he glances up and sees he left the rope hanging from the building. Leaving the engine running, he rushes back into the building and boards the elevator. As it ascends, the security guard switches off the power and locks up for the weekend, trapping Julien between floors.

Moments later, Julien's car is stolen by Louis, a young small-time crook, and his girlfriend Véronique, a flower shop assistant. Waiting for Julien at a nearby café, Florence sees the car go by, with Véronique leaning out the window. Assuming Julien could not go through with their plan and has picked up Véronique, she wanders the Paris streets despondently all night, searching for him in local bars and clubs.

Louis puts on Julien's coat and pockets Julien's revolver, which Véronique finds in the glovebox. They drive back and forth on the highway for hours, until some Germans in a sporty Mercedes challenge Louis to a race. He follows them to a motel just off the highway, and the German driver, the jovial Horst Bencker, invites Louis and Véronique to have a drink with him and his wife Frieda. Both couples check in and, while they chat, Frieda takes a few pictures of Louis and her husband with Julien's camera. She finishes the roll, so Véronique drops the film off at the motel's photo lab.

After the Benckers go to bed, Louis, worried because Horst had figured out he is not Julien Tavernier and annoyed because Horst had not taken him more seriously, attempts to steal the Mercedes, but Horst catches him and threatens him with a Cigar Tube held like a gun. Louis impulsively shoots and kills both Horst and Frieda with Julien's gun, firing until it is empty. He and Véronique return to Paris in the Mercedes and hide in Véronique's apartment. Convinced they will be caught and separated, Véronique persuades Louis they should commit suicide, so they both swallow phenobarbital pills and go to sleep.

Because Véronique registered at the motel using the names "Mr. and Mrs. Julien Tavernier" to avoid problems for Louis, who is wanted for petty crimes, and Julien's car, gun, and raincoat are found next to the Benckers' corpses, the police name Julien as the prime suspect. Officers go to search his office, escorted by the security guard, who eventually discovers Simon's body. Meanwhile, with the building's power back on, Julien finally escapes from the elevator. Unaware his picture is in the morning newspapers in connection to the Bencker case, he goes to the café for some breakfast, but is quickly recognized, arrested, and charged with killing the Benckers, the police refusing to believe his alibi of being stuck in an elevator.

Florence, determined to clear Julien, gets Véronique's address from the florist. She finds Véronique and Louis drowsy, but alive, and calls the police with an anonymous tip. Louis reads the newspaper and thinks he has gotten away with murder, until Véronique reminds him of the roll of film. He rushes to the motel's photo lab, tailed by Florence, but finds the pictures have already been developed, and he is arrested. Florence enters the lab, and the police show her the photographs of her and Julien that were on the roll, which make it clear they were secret lovers and give them a motive for killing her husband. Commissaire Cherrier says Florence will probably get a harsher sentence than Julien, but she, almost in a trance, replies that she did what she did for love and she and Julien will one day be reunited.

Cast

 Jeanne Moreau as Florence Carala
 Maurice Ronet as Julien Tavernier
 Georges Poujouly as Louis
 Yori Bertin as Véronique
 Jean Wall as Simon Carala
 Lino Ventura as Police Commissaire Cherrier
 Félix Marten as Christian Subervie
 Iván Petrovich as Horst Bencker
 Elga Andersen as Frieda Bencker
 Micheline Bona as Geneviève, the secretary
 Gérard Darrieu as Maurice, the daytime security guard
 Charles Denner as Commissaire Cherrier's Deputy
 Hubert Deschamps as Deputy Prosecutor

Jean-Claude Brialy makes an uncredited appearance as a motel guest.

Production
This low-budget black-and-white production was 24-year-old Louis Malle's first feature film. He had previously worked with Jacques Cousteau for several years, and was credited as co-director of the documentary The Silent World (1956).

Malle cast Moreau after seeing her in the Paris stage production of Tennessee Williams' Cat on a Hot Tin Roof. She had already been in a number of films, but her role in this film is often considered her breakthrough. Malle filmed her without the heavy makeup and extreme lighting that previous directors had demanded. Scenes of Moreau wandering down the Champs Elysees at night were shot on fast film from a baby carriage using only available light from the street and shop windows.

Miles Davis's score for the film is considered by many to be groundbreaking, with jazz critic Phil Johnson describing it as "The loneliest trumpet sound you will ever hear, and the model for sad-core music ever since. Hear it and weep." Recorded in one night, it was improvised by Davis and four other musicians while they watched the relevant scenes from the film. The music influenced the later development of Davis's music and jazz in general, as well as soundtracks in later movies.

Critical response
For Time, the journalist Barry Farrell wrote:

In a review written for the film's 2005 theatrical re-release, Roger Ebert observed that Moreau's face when Florence is pondering Julien's whereabouts "is often illuminated only by the lights of the cafes and shops that she passes; at a time when actresses were lit and photographed with care, these scenes had a shock value, and influenced many films to come." He further argued that Louis and Veronique were a precursor to the young couple in Jean-Luc Godard's Breathless (1960).  In a 2016 article, New Yorker film critic Richard Brody claimed the film is more important for its place in French film history than for its own artistic merits, with the exception of Miles Davis' score, which he said "is worth hearing entirely on its own. It’s better than the film itself, by far, and there are better ways to hear it than in the movie—namely, by listening to a CD that features the entire studio sessions from which the score was edited." Brody then went on to discuss the music in some detail.

On Rotten Tomatoes, the film holds a 93% "Certified Fresh" rating, based on 56 reviews, with a weighted average of 8.08/10. On Metacritic, it holds a rating of 94/100, indicating "universal acclaim".

Remakes
There have been two film adaptations of Calef's novel since Malle's version: Shikeidai No Erebêtâ (2010), by Japanese filmmaker Akira Ogata, and Weekend (2013), by Russian filmmaker Stanislav Govorukhin.

References

External links
 
 
 
 
 Chef du Cinema: Elevator to the Gallows an essay by Terrence Rafferty at the Criterion Collection

1958 films
1958 directorial debut films
1950s crime thriller films
1950s psychological thriller films
Adultery in films
French black-and-white films
French psychological thriller films
1950s French-language films
French crime thriller films
Film noir
Louis Delluc Prize winners
Films based on French novels
Films based on crime novels
Films directed by Louis Malle
Films scored by Miles Davis
Films set in Paris
Films shot in Paris
Films with screenplays by Roger Nimier
1950s French films